Lorne P-12 College is a government school in Victoria, Australia. It is located in Lorne and conducts pre-primary, primary and secondary classes. The Lorne campus and Aireys Inlet campus deamalgamated at the beginning of 2017 and renamed the Lorne campus to Lorne P-12 College.

Notable alumni 

 Luka Lesosky-Hay, AFLW footballer for the Richmond Football Club
 Ned Reeves, AFL footballer for the Hawthorn Football Club
Jack Steven, AFL footballer for the Geelong Football Club, and formerly the St Kilda Football Club

References

Public high schools in Victoria (Australia)